Julius Angelo Carpenter (August 19, 1827 – March 30, 1880) was the founder of Carpentersville, Illinois, and its first prominent citizen. Carpenter came with his family from Massachusetts and settled near the Fox River. Carpenter built the settlement's first store, bridge, and factory. He served two consecutive terms in the Illinois House of Representatives.

Biography
Julius Angelo Carpenter was born on August 19, 1827, in Uxbridge, Massachusetts, to Daniel G. Carpenter. Daniel and his brother Charles V. intended to settle in the Rock River Valley on their voyage east from Massachusetts. However, they were unable to cross the Fox River. Angelo, his father, and uncle then became the first settlers of what was originally known as Carpenters' Grove.

Angelo Carpenter became the first settler of what would become Carpentersville, Illinois. He opened the first store there when he was 23 and, at his own expense, built the first bridge in the vicinity across the Fox River in 1851. Carpenter platted the settlement and, in commemoration, locals renamed the town Carpentersville. Carpenter was appointed postmaster and Supervisor of the village. In 1852, he married Mary Edwards. They had three children: Ella Elizabeth, Alice May, and Julius Angelo, Jr., who died as an infant. In 1864, Carpenter founded the Illinois Iron & Bolt Company in a former reaper factory. The new factory produced springs, clothes irons, and other metal accessories.

Carpenter successfully ran for a seat in the Illinois House of Representatives in 1871. Carpenter moved to Elgin at the end of his second and final term in 1875. After expanding the company's operations by purchasing the nearby Star Manufacturing Company in 1873, Carpenter was able to persuade the Chicago and North Western Railroad to build a station in Carpentersville. Carpenter used his own funds to build an iron bridge to accommodate the new track. By 1912, when the two factories consolidates, they employed 2,000 people. He died after a short illness on March 30, 1880, and was buried in Bluff City Cemetery in Elgin. His widow Mary dedicated Library Hall in Carpentersville in his memory.

References

1827 births
1880 deaths
Republican Party members of the Illinois House of Representatives
People from Elgin, Illinois
People from Uxbridge, Massachusetts
19th-century American politicians
People from Carpentersville, Illinois